Radgonica is a small settlement east of Dole in the Municipality of Litija in central Slovenia. The area is part of the traditional region of Lower Carniola. It is now included with the rest of the municipality in the Central Sava Statistical Region.

References

External links
Radgonica on Geopedia

Populated places in the Municipality of Litija